Buldan may refer to:

People
 Pervin Buldan, Kurdish politician
 Savaş Buldan, Kurdish businessman

Places
 Buldan, town and a district of Denizli Province
 Buldan Dam, dam in Denizli Province

Turkish-language surnames